Nong-O Gaiyanghadao (born November 10, 1986), formerly known as Nong-O Sit Or and Nong-O Gaiyanghadaogym, and now known as Nong-O Hama, is a Muay Thai fighter currently signed to ONE Championship and is the reigning ONE Bantamweight Muay Thai World Champion. As of November 24, 2022, he is ranked #3 in the ONE Bantamweight Kickboxing rankings.

After taking a hiatus from Muay Thai in 2015, he became a Muay Thai instructor at Evolve MMA in Singapore until he left the gym in September 2022. He would then make his comeback at ONE Championship: Heroes of Honor on April 20, 2018. He is a seven-division Muay Thai champion, having won 2 Thailand titles, 1 Rajadamnern Stadium title, 3 Lumpinee Stadium titles, and 1 ONE Championship title. As of December 2020 he is the number 6 pound-for-pound fighter in the world according to The Nation.

Biography

Early career
Nong-O Sit Or (น้องโอ๋ ศิษย์ อ.) was born as Apichet Khotanan in Sakon Nakhon Province in the Northeastern (Isan) region of Thailand. He had his first fight at the age of 9. He became interested in Muay Thai when he saw one of his neighbors training. Nong-O was invited to train, and after a month of training he had his first fight.

2008
On August 3, 2008, Nong-O fought against Kōji Okuyama at Keio Plaza hotel in Hachiōji, Tokyo, and he won by KO with left elbow strike during 3rd round. December 9, 2008, he fought against Wutidet Lukprabath at Lumpinee Stadium in the memorial event of Lumpinee Stadium establishment. He won by decision after five rounds.

2009
On January 18, 2009, Nong-O fought against Tomoaki Suehiro at Yoyogi National Gymnasium for the Muay Thai event Muay Lok. He won by TKO when the referee stopped the contest after he knocked Suehiro down twice with a right hook and left hook during first round. After the contest, he was given a bunch of flowers by Shinya Aoki. Nong-O was going to fight against Shunta Itō in the beginning, but he was replaced because his legs had not healed enough.

On November 8, 2009, he fought against Trijak Sitjomtrai in Japan. Trijak was the current champion at featherweight sanctioned by the Professional Boxing Association of Thailand, but Nong-O won by majority decision (2-0) after five rounds.

On December 8, Nong-O fought against Petboonchu F.A. Group for his Lumpinee Stadium title at Super featherweight (130 lbs). Nong-O won by decision and became the new champion.

2010
On January 17, 2010, Nong-O participated in the tournament Yod Muay Champions Cup 60kg in Japan. He fought against Singdam Kiatmoo9 in the first match. After five rounds, the bout was declared a draw. Nong-O lost by the split decision after extra round (6th round). On December 9, he challenged Saenchai's titles of Lumpinee Stadium and WMC, but he lost by decision.

2011
On January 19, 2011, Nong-O Sit Or was named 2010 Boxer of the Year at the Society of Friends of Sportswriters Awards Night in Bangkok.

2012
Nong-O started the year with a win over Singdam in February and followed it up the following month with another win over F16 Rajanon. He then lost a very close fight to Singdam in May, which many thought Nong-O had done enough to win, but beat Petboonchu FA Group in June. On 31 July he fought Singdam in the main event at Lumpinee Stadium and was defeated by unanimous decision.

He faced Petboonchu F.A. Group for the seventh time on October 12, 2012 at Rajadamnern Stadium.

He TKO'd Mongkolchai Phetsupaphan in five on February 7, 2013.

He beat Singdam Kiatmuu9 on points to win the Lumpinee lightweight belt on June 7, 2013.

Return after hiatus to ONE Championship

2018
Following a competitive hiatus in which he moved to Singapore to coach at Evolve, Nong-O returned in 2018 when ONE Championship unveiled their new striking format: the ONE Super Series. Nong-O debuted on April 20 at ONE Championship: Heroes of Honor and defeated Fabio Pinca via unanimous decision. He returned to his Thai homeland in October at ONE Championship: Kingdom of Heroes, and defeated Mehdi Zatout via unanimous decision.

2019: ONE Muay Thai Bantamweight World Champion
On February 16, 2019, Nong-O defeated Han Zihao by unanimous decision to become the inaugural ONE Bantamweight Muay Thai World Champion at ONE Championship: Clash of Legends in Bangkok.

On May 10, 2019, he would defend his ONE Bantamweight Muay Thai World Championship against Hiroaki Suzuki at ONE Championship: Warriors of Light, winning by unanimous decision and retaining his title.

He made his second title defense against Brice Delval at ONE Championship: Immortal Triumph in Ho Chi Minh City on September 6, 2019, featuring ONE Championship's first event in Vietnam and first all-striking card, where he successfully retained the ONE Bantamweight Muay Thai World Championship via a closely contested split decision win.

Nong-O is scheduled to make his third title defense against Saemapetch Fairtex at ONE Championship: Edge Of Greatness on November 22, 2019. Nong-O successfully defended his ONE Bantamweight Muay Thai World Championship against Saemapetch Fairtex, winning by fourth-round knockout in a fight where he knocked down Saemapetch twice in the second round.

2020: Fight with Rodlek
After Alaverdi Ramazanov won the ONE Bantamweight Kickboxing World Championship at ONE Championship: Edge Of Greatness, he expressed interest in defending his title against Nong-O. A title fight between the two was scheduled for ONE Championship: Heart of Heroes on March 20, 2020. However, the event was cancelled due to the COVID-19 pandemic.

Instead, Nong-O was scheduled to defend his ONE Bantamweight Muay Thai World Championship against Rodlek P.K. Saenchaimuaythaigym after the latter won the 2020 ONE Bantamweight Muay Thai Tournament at ONE Championship: A New Breed. He was scheduled to defend his title against Rodlek at ONE Championship: Collision Course on December 18, 2020. He successfully defended his title with a third round knockout of Rodlek.

2022
Nong-O made his fifth title defense of the ONE Bantamweight Muay Thai World Championship against Felipe Lobo at ONE: X on March 26, 2022. He won the bout after knocking out Lobo with an uppercut in the third round.

Nong-O defended his ONE Bantamweight Muay Thai World Championship against Liam Harrison at ONE on Prime Video 1 on August 27, 2022. He won the bout in the first round after Harrison was unable to continue due to leg kicks.

2023
Nong-O was scheduled to face former ONE Bantamweight Muay Thai World Champion Alaverdi Ramazanov for his seventh title defense on January 14, 2023, at ONE on Prime Video 6. However, the bout was moved to headline at ONE Friday Fights 1 on January 20. He won the bout via knockout in the third round.

Nong-O is scheduled to make his eighth title defense against the former ONE Flyweight Muay Thai World champion Jonathan Haggerty on April 22, 2023, at ONE Fight Night 9.

Titles and accomplishments
Muay Thai
ONE Championship 
2019 ONE Bantamweight Muay Thai World Champion (145 lbs/66 kg) (Current)
Seven successful title defenses
Performance of the Night (One time) 
Rajadamnern Stadium 
2014 Rajadamnern Stadium Lightweight (135 lbs/61 kg) champion
Toyota Vigo Marathon 
2011 Toyota Vigo Marathon Tournament (130 lbs/59 kg) champion
Lumpinee Stadium
2013 Lumpinee Stadium Lightweight (135 lbs/61 kg) champion 
 2010 Lumpinee Stadium Fighter of the Year
2009 Lumpinee Stadium Super Featherweight (130 lbs/59 kg) champion
2007 Lumpinee Stadium Featherweight (126 lbs/57 kg) champion 
2006 Lumpinee Stadium Super Bantamweight (122 lbs/56 kg) champion
2005 Lumpinee Stadium Fighter of the Year
Professional Boxing Association of Thailand (PAT) 
2012 Thailand Lightweight (135 lbs/61 kg) champion
2005 Thailand Bantamweight champion
2× Thailand Super Bantamweight (122 lbs/56 kg) champion
Awards
2010 Sports Authority of Thailand Fighter of the Year
2005 Sports Authority of Thailand Fighter of the Year
2005 Sports Writers Association of Thailand Fighter of the Year

Muay Thai record

|-  style="background:#;"
| 2023-04-22 ||   ||align=left| Jonathan Haggerty ||  ONE Fight Night 9 ||  ||   ||   || 
|-
! style=background:white colspan=9 |
|-  style="background:#cfc;"
| 2023-01-20|| Win  ||align=left| Alaverdi Ramazanov ||  ONE Friday Fights 1, Lumpinee Stadium || Bangkok, Thailand || KO (Body punch)  || 3  || 2:12
|-
! style=background:white colspan=9 |
|-  style="background:#cfc;"
| 2022-08-27|| Win ||align=left| Liam Harrison || ONE on Prime Video 1 || Kallang, Singapore || KO (Leg Kick) || 1 || 2:10
|-
! style=background:white colspan=9 |
|-  style="background:#cfc;"
| 2022-03-25|| Win ||align=left| Felipe Lobo || ONE: X|| Kallang, Singapore || KO (Right uppercut) || 3 || 2:15 
|-
! style=background:white colspan=9 |
|-
|-  style="background:#cfc;"
| 2020-12-18|| Win ||align=left| Rodlek P.K. Saenchaimuaythaigym || ONE Championship: Collision Course || Kallang, Singapore || KO (Right cross) || 3 || 1:12    
|-
! style=background:white colspan=9 |
|-  style="background:#cfc;"
| 2019-11-22|| Win ||align=left| Saemapetch Fairtex || ONE Championship: Edge Of Greatness || Kallang, Singapore || KO (Right cross) || 4 ||1:46 
|-
! style=background:white colspan=9 |
|-  style="background:#cfc;"
| 2019-09-06|| Win ||align=left| Brice Delval || ONE Championship: Immortal Triumph || Ho Chi Minh City, Vietnam || Decision (Split) || 5 ||3:00 
|-
! style=background:white colspan=9 |
|-  style="background:#CCFFCC;"
| 2019-05-10|| Win ||align=left| Hiroaki Suzuki || ONE Championship: Warriors of Light || Bangkok, Thailand || Decision (Unanimous)|| 5 || 3:00
|-
! style=background:white colspan=9 |
|-  style="background:#CCFFCC;"
| 2019-02-16|| Win ||align=left| Han Zihao || ONE Championship: Clash of Legends || Bangkok, Thailand || Decision (Unanimous)|| 5 || 3:00
|-
! style=background:white colspan=9 |
|-
|-  style="background:#cfc;"
| 2018-10-06 || Win||align=left| Mehdi Zatout || ONE Championship: Kingdom of Heroes  || Bangkok, Thailand || Decision (Unanimous) || 3 || 3:00
|-
|-  style="background:#cfc;"
|2018-04-20 || Win||align=left| Fabio Pinca || ONE Championship: Heroes of Honor || Pasay, Philippines || Decision (Unanimous) || 3 || 3:00
|-  style="background:#fbb;"
| 2015-04-02 || Loss ||align=left| Chamuaktong Sor.Yupinda || Rajadamnern Stadium || Bangkok, Thailand ||Decision || 5  || 3:00
|-  style="background:#cfc;"
| 2014-11-25 || Win ||align=left| Kiatpetch Suanaharnpikmai || Lumpinee Stadium || Bangkok, Thailand || KO (uppercut) || 3 || 
|-  style="background:#cfc;"
| 2014-10-31 ||Win ||align=left| Petchboonchu FA Group || Toyota marathon  || Thailand || Decision || 3 || 3:00
|-
! style=background:white colspan=9 |
|-  style="background:#cfc;"
| 2014-10-31 ||Win ||align=left| Shota Sato || Toyota marathon || Thailand || Decision || 3 || 3:00
|-  style="background:#cfc;"
| 2014-09-26 ||Win ||align=left| Detnarong Wor Suntaranon || Toyota marathon  || Thailand || KO (body kick) || 1 || 
|-
! style=background:white colspan=9 |
|-  style="background:#cfc;"
| 2014-09-26 ||Win ||align=left| Stephen Hodgers || Toyota marathon  || Thailand || TKO (body kick) || 1 || 
|-  style="background:#cfc;"
| 2014-09-26 ||Win ||align=left| Leonard Nganga || Toyota marathon  || Thailand || KO (body punch) || 3 || 
|-  style="background:#cfc;"
| 2014-09-10 || Win ||align=left| Chamuaktong Sor.Yupinda || Rajadamnern Stadium || Bangkok, Thailand || Decision || 5 || 3:00
|-  style="background:#cfc;"
| 2014-08-14 || Win ||align=left| Pakorn PKSaenchaimuaythaigym ||Rajadamnern Stadium|| Bangkok, Thailand || Decision || 5 || 3:00 
|-  style="background:#fbb;"
| 2014-07-16 || Loss||align=left|  Pakorn PKSaenchaimuaythaigym  ||Rajadamnern Stadium|| Bangkok, Thailand || Decision || 5 || 3:00 
|-  style="background:#cfc;"
| 2014-05-08 || Win ||align=left| Singdam Kiatmuu9 || Rajadamnern Stadium || Bangkok, Thailand || Decision || 5 || 3:00
|-
! style=background:white colspan=9 |
|-  style="background:#cfc;"
| 2014-01-21 || Win ||align=left| Petpanomrung Kiatmuu9  || Lumpinee Stadium || Bangkok, Thailand || Decision || 5 || 3:00
|-  style="background:#fbb;"
| 2013-12-03 || Loss ||align=left| Chamuaktong Sor.Yupinda || Lumpinee Stadium || Bangkok, Thailand || Decision || 5 || 3:00
|-
! style=background:white colspan=9 | 
|-  style="background:#cfc;"
| 2013-10-31 ||Win ||align=left| Hamsa Rahmani || Toyota marathon  || Thailand || KO || 2 || 
|-  style="background:#fbb;"
| 2013-10-11 || Loss ||align=left| Chamuaktong Sor.Yupinda || Lumpinee Stadium || Bangkok, Thailand || Decision || 5 || 3:00
|-  style="background:#c5d2ea;"
| 2013-09-11 || Draw ||align=left|  Pakorn PKSaenchaimuaythaigym  ||Rajadamnern Stadium|| Bangkok, Thailand || Decision || 5 || 3:00 
|-  style="background:#fbb;"
| 2013-07-12 || Loss ||align=left| Singdam Kiatmuu9 || Lumpinee Stadium || Bangkok, Thailand || Decision || 5 || 3:00
|-  style="background:#cfc;"
| 2013-06-07 || Win ||align=left| Singdam Kiatmuu9 || Lumpinee Stadium || Bangkok, Thailand || Decision || 5 || 3:00
|-
! style=background:white colspan=9 |
|-  style="background:#c5d2ea;"
| 2013-05-03 || Draw ||align=left| Pakorn Sakyothin ||Lumpinee Stadium|| Bangkok, Thailand || Decision || 5 || 3:00 
|-  style="background:#cfc;"
| 2013-04-09 || Win ||align=left| Kongsak Saenchaimuaythaigym || Petchyindee Fight, Lumpinee Stadium|| Bangkok, Thailand || Decision || 5 || 3:00 
|-  style="background:#cfc;"
| 2013-02-07 || Win ||align=left| Mongkolchai Kwaitonggym || Rajadamnern Stadium|| Bangkok, Thailand || TKO || 5 || 
|-  style="background:#fbb;"
| 2012-12-07 || Loss ||align=left| Yodwicha Por Boonsit || Lumpinee Stadium || Bangkok, Thailand || Decision || 5 || 3:00 
|-  style="background:#cfc;"
| 2012-11-02 || Win ||align=left| Thongchai Sitsongpeenong || Petchyindee Fight, Lumpinee Stadium|| Bangkok, Thailand || Decision || 5 || 3:00 
|-  style="background:#fbb;"
| 2012-10-04 || Loss ||align=left| Petchboonchu FA Group || Rajadamnern Stadium Wanmitchai Fight || Bangkok, Thailand || Decision || 5 || 3:00 
|-  style="background:#fbb;"
| 2012-07-31 || Loss ||align=left| Singdam Kiatmuu9 || Lumpinee Stadium || Bangkok, Thailand || Decision || 5 || 3:00 
|-  style="background:#cfc;"
| 2012-06-08 || Win ||align=left| Petchboonchu FA Group || Lumpinee Champion Krikkrai Fight || Bangkok, Thailand || Decision || 5 || 3:00 
|-
! style=background:white colspan=9 |
|-  style="background:#fbb;"
| 2012-05-04 || Loss ||align=left| Singdam Kiatmuu9 || Ruamnamjai (Special) Fight, Lumpinee Stadium || Bangkok, Thailand || Decision || 5 || 3:00 
|-  style="background:#cfc;"
| 2012-03-12 ||Win ||align=left| F-16 Rachanon || Rajadamnern Stadium || Bangkok, Thailand || Decision || 5 || 3:00 
|-  style="background:#cfc;"
| 2012-02-03 || Win ||align=left| Singdam Kiatmuu9 || Lumpinee Stadium || Bangkok, Thailand || Decision || 5 || 3:00
|-  style="background:#cfc;"
| 2011-- || Win ||align=left| Singdam Kiatmuu9 || Southern Thailand || Koh Samui, Thailand || Decision || 5 || 3:00
|-  style="background:#fbb;"
| 2011-10-07 ||Loss ||align=left| F-16 Rachanon || Lumpinee Stadium || Bangkok, Thailand || Decision || 5 || 3:00 
|-  style="background:#cfc;"
| 2011-09-06 || Win ||align=left| Sittisak Petpayathai || Kriangkrai Kiatpetch, Lumpinee Stadium || Bangkok, Thailand || KO || 4 || 1:42
|-  style="background:#cfc;"
| 2011-08-04 || Win ||align=left| Traijak Sitjomtrai || Toyota Vigo Marathon, Channel 7 Stadium || Bangkok, Thailand || Decision || 3 || 3:00
|-
! style=background:white colspan=9 |
|-  style="background:#cfc;"
| 2011-08-04 || Win ||align=left| Panphet Chor Na Pattalung || Toyota Vigo Marathon, Channel 7 Stadium || Bangkok, Thailand || Decision || 3 || 3:00
|-  style="background:#cfc;"
| 2011-08-04 || Win ||align=left| Mongkolchai Kwaitonggym || Toyota Vigo Marathon, Channel 7 Stadium || Bangkok, Thailand || Decision || 3 || 3:00
|-  style="background:#fbb;"
| 2011-07-07 ||Loss ||align=left| F-16 Rachanon || Rajadamnern Stadium || Bangkok, Thailand || Decision || 5 || 3:00 
|-  style="background:#fbb;"
| 2011-06-10 ||Loss ||align=left| Kongsak Saenchaimuaythaigym || Suek Lumpinee Champion Krikkrai || Bangkok, Thailand || Decision || 5 || 3:00 
|-
! style=background:white colspan=9 |
|-  style="background:#fbb;"
| 2011-05-05 || Loss ||align=left| Jomthong Chuwattana || Suek Daorungchujaroen, Rajadamnern Stadium || Bangkok, Thailand || Decision || 5 || 3:00
|-  style="background:#fbb;"
| 2011-03-31 || Loss ||align=left| Jomthong Chuwattana || Suek Rajadamnern - Lumpinee For Tsunami Japan || Bangkok, Thailand || Decision || 5 || 3:00
|-  style="background:#fbb;"
| 2011-01-25 || Loss ||align=left| Sagetdao Petpayathai || Suek Kiatpet, Lumpinee Stadium || Bangkok, Thailand || Decision || 5 || 3:00
|-  style="background:#fbb;"
| 2010-12-29 || Loss ||align=left| Saenchai Sinbimuaythai || Suek Oneminchai, Rajadamnern Stadium || Bangkok, Thailand || Decision || 5 || 3:00
|-
! style=background:white colspan=9 |
|-  style="background:#cfc;"
| 2010-11-02 || Win ||align=left| Petchboonchu FA Group || Suek Lumpinee-Rajadamnern Special || Bangkok, Thailand || TKO || 3 || 
|-  style="background:#cfc;"
| 2010-10-05 || Win ||align=left| Pakorn Sakyothin || Suek Lumpinee Champion Krikkrai || Bangkok, Thailand || Decision || 5 || 3:00
|-
! style=background:white colspan=9 |
|-  style="background:#cfc;"
| 2010-09-07 || Win ||align=left| Sam-A Kaiyanghadaogym || Suek Petsupapan, Lumpinee Stadium || Bangkok, Thailand || Decision || 5 || 3:00
|-  style="background:#cfc;"
| 2010-08-10 || Win ||align=left| Pornsanae Sitmonchai || Suek Petchpiya, Lumpinee Stadium || Bangkok, Thailand || Decision || 5 || 3:00
|-  style="background:#cfc;"
| 2010-07-13 || Win ||align=left| Singdam Kiatmuu9 || Suek Ruamnamjaiwongkarnmuay, Lumpinee Stadium || Bangkok, Thailand || Decision || 5 || 3:00
|-
! style=background:white colspan=9 |
|-  style="background:#fbb;"
| 2010-05-05 || Loss ||align=left| Saenchai Sor Kingstar || Suek Oneminchai, Rajadamnern Stadium || Bangkok, Thailand || TKO || 3 || 
|-  style="background:#cfc;"
| 2010-04-02 || Win ||align=left| Singdam Kiatmuu9 || Suek Onewerapon, Lumpinee Stadium || Bangkok, Thailand || Decision || 5 || 3:00
|-  style="background:#cfc;"
| 2010-03-12 || Win ||align=left| Petchboonchu FA Group || Suek Petyindee, Lumpinee Stadium || Bangkok, Thailand || TKO || 2 || 
|-
! style=background:white colspan=9 |
|-  style="background:#cfc;"
| 2010-02-12 || Win ||align=left| Sagetdao Petpayathai || Suek Eminetair, Lumpinee Stadium || Bangkok, Thailand || Decision || 5 || 3:00
|-  style="background:#fbb;"
| 2010-01-17 || Loss ||align=left| Singdam Kiatmuu9 || Muay 2010 1st Muay Lok Prestage || Kōtō, Tokyo, Japan || Ext.R Decision (Split) || 6 || 3:00
|-
! style=background:white colspan=9 |
|-  style="background:#cfc;"
| 2009-12-08 || Win ||align=left| Petchboonchu FA Group || Lumpinee Birthday Show || Bangkok, Thailand || TKO || 1 || 
|-
! style=background:white colspan=9 |
|-  style="background:#cfc;"
| 2009-11-08 || Win ||align=left| Trijak Sitjomtrai || M-1: Muay Thai Challenge 2009 Yod Nak Suu vol.4 || Kōtō, Tokyo, Japan || Decision || 5 || 3:00
|-  style="background:#fbb;"
| 2009-09-29 || Loss ||align=left| Saenchai Sor Kingstar || Suek Wanwerapon, Lumpinee Stadium || Bangkok, Thailand || Decision || 5 || 3:00
|-  style="background:#fbb;"
| 2009-09-04 || Loss ||align=left| Petchboonchu FA Group || Suek Muay Thai champions of Lumpinee Champion Krikkrai || Bangkok, Thailand || Decision || 5 || 3:00
|-
! style=background:white colspan=9 |
|-  style="background:#cfc;"
| 2009-08-06 || Win ||align=left| Jomthong Chuwattana || Suek Rajadamnern + Lumpinee Super || Bangkok, Thailand || Decision || 5 || 3:00
|-  style="background:#cfc;"
| 2009-07-03 || Win ||align=left| Singtongnoi Por.Telakun || Suek Lumpinee vs Rajadamnern Special || Bangkok, Thailand || Decision || 5 || 3:00
|-  style="background:#c5d2ea;"
| 2009-05-22 || Draw ||align=left| Singdam Kiatmuu9 || Por.Pramuk Fight, Lumpinee Stadium || Bangkok, Thailand || Decision draw || 5 || 3:00
|-  style="background:#cfc;"
| 2009-05-01 || Win ||align=left| Petchboonchu FA Group || Suek Petsupapan, Lumpinee Stadium || Bangkok, Thailand || Decision || 5 || 3:00
|-  style="background:#cfc;"
| 2009-03-20 || Win ||align=left| Lerdsila Chumpairtour || Suek Petchyindee, Lumpinee Stadium || Bangkok, Thailand || Decision || 5 || 3:00
|-  style="background:#cfc;"
| 2009-02-24 || Win ||align=left| Orono Wor Petchpun || Por.Pramuk Fights, Lumpinee Stadium || Bangkok, Thailand || Decision (3-2) || 5 || 3:00
|-  style="background:#cfc;"
| 2009-01-18 || Win ||align=left| Tomoaki Suehiro || M.I.D. Japan presents "Muay Lok Japan 2009" || Shibuya, Tokyo, Japan || TKO (Referee stoppage) || 1 || 0:58
|-  style="background:#fbb;"
| 2009-01-06 || Loss ||align=left| Saenchai Sor Kingstar || Suek Petsupapan, Lumpinee Stadium || Bangkok, Thailand || KO || 3 || 
|-  style="background:#cfc;"
| 2008-12-09 || Win ||align=left| Wuttidet Lukprabat || Lumpinee Champion Krikkrai Fight || Bangkok, Thailand || Decision || 5 || 3:00
|-  style="background:#c5d2ea;"
| 2008-10-13 || Draw ||align=left| Singtongnoi Por.Telakun || Sor Sommay Fights, Rajadamnern Stadium || Bangkok, Thailand || Decision draw || 5 || 3:00
|-  style="background:#fbb;"
| 2008-09-04 || Loss ||align=left| Wuttidet Lukprabat || Daorungprabath Fights, Rajadamnern Stadium || Bangkok, Thailand || TKO || 4 || 
|-  style="background:#cfc;"
| 2008-08-03 || Win ||align=left| Kōji Okuyama || Deek: "Target 1st" || Hachiōji, Tokyo, Japan || KO (Left elbow) || 3 || 0:49
|-  style="background:#cfc;"
| 2008-07-14 || Win ||align=left| Lohngern Pitakcruchaydan || Sor Sommay Fights, Rajadamnern Stadium || Bangkok, Thailand || Decision || 5 || 3:00
|-  style="background:#fbb;"
| 2008-05-30 || Loss ||align=left| Singdam Kiatmuu9 || Fairtex Fights, Lumpinee Stadium || Bangkok, Thailand || Decision || 5 || 3:00
|-  style="background:#cfc;"
| 2008-04-29 || Win ||align=left| Yodbuangarm Lookbaanyai || Prianan Fights, Lumpinee Stadium || Bangkok, Thailand || Decision || 5 || 3:00
|-  style="background:#fbb;"
| 2008-02-05 || Loss ||align=left| Chalermdeth Infinity || Lumpinee champion Krikkri Fights || Bangkok, Thailand || Decision || 5 || 3:00
|-  style="background:#cfc;"
| 2007-12-07 || Win ||align=left| Sagetdao Petpayathai || Lumpinichampion Krikkri Fights, Lumpinee Stadium || Bangkok, Thailand || Decision || 5 || 3:00
|-  style="background:#cfc;"
| 2007-08-24 || Win ||align=left| Anuwat Kaewsamrit || Lumpinee Stadium || Bangkok, Thailand || Decision || 5 || 3:00
|-  style="background:#cfc;"
| 2007-06-22 || Win ||align=left| Denkiri Sor.Sommai || Phetsupapan Fights, Lumpinee Stadium || Bangkok, Thailand || TKO || 3 || 
|-  style="background:#c5d2ea;"
| 2007-05-23 || Draw ||align=left| Denkiri Sor.Sommai || Sor.Sommai Fights, Rajadamnern Stadium || Bangkok, Thailand || Decision draw || 5 || 3:00
|-  style="background:#cfc;"
| 2007-04-23 || Win ||align=left| Karnchai Ch.Sungprapai || Sor.Sommai Fights, Rajadamnern Stadium || Bangkok, Thailand || Decision || 5 || 3:00
|-  style="background:#fbb;"
| 2007-03-06 || Loss ||align=left| Chalermdeth Infinity || Wanboonya Fights, Lumpinee Stadium || Bangkok, Thailand || TKO || 2 ||
|-  style="background:#fbb;"
| 2007-01-30 || Loss ||align=left| Pokaew Fonjangchonburi || Phetyindee Fights, Lumpinee Stadium || Bangkok, Thailand || Decision || 5 || 3:00
|-  style="background:#cfc;"
| 2006-11-09 || Win ||align=left| Pokaew Fonjangchonburi || Phetjaopraya Fights, Lumpinee Stadium || Bangkok, Thailand || Decision || 5 || 3:00
|-  style="background:#fbb;"
| 2006-10-19 || Loss ||align=left| Pokaew Fonjangchonburi || Phetpiya Fights, Lumpinee Stadium || Bangkok, Thailand || Decision || 5 || 3:00
|-
! style=background:white colspan=9 |
|-  style="background:#fbb;"
| 2006-09-15 || Loss ||align=left| Traijak Sitjomtrai || Phetpiya Fights, Lumpinee Stadium || Bangkok, Thailand || Decision || 5 || 3:00
|-  style="background:#fbb;"
| 2006-08-18 || Loss ||align=left| Saenchai Sor.Khamsing || Phetyindee Fights, Lumpinee Stadium || Bangkok, Thailand || Decision || 5 || 3:00
|-  style="background:#cfc;"
| 2006-07-21 || Win ||align=left| Wuttidet Lukprabat|| Wanboonya Fights, Lumpinee Stadium || Bangkok, Thailand || TKO || 2 || 
|-  style="background:#cfc;"
| 2006-06-02 || Win ||align=left| Phetmanee Phetsupapan || Lumpinee Champion Krikkri Fights || Bangkok, Thailand || Decision || 5 || 3:00
|-  style="background:#cfc;"
| 2006-05-22 || Win ||align=left| Petchmanee Petchsupraphan || Lumpinee Stadium || Bangkok, Thailand || Decision || 5 || 3:00
|-  style="background:#cfc;"
| 2006-04-25 || Win ||align=left| Denkiree 13Lianresort || Lumpinee Stadium || Bangkok, Thailand || Decision || 5 || 3:00
|-
! style=background:white colspan=9 |
|-  style="background:#c5d2ea;"
| 2006-03-31 || Draw ||align=left| Wuttidet Lukprabat || Lumpinee Stadium || Bangkok, Thailand || Decision || 5 || 3:00
|-  style="background:#fbb;"
| 2006-03-06 || Loss ||align=left| Chalermdeth Infinity || Wanboonya Fights, Lumpinee Stadium || Bangkok, Thailand || TKO || 2 || 
|-  style="background:#fbb;"
| 2006-02-24 || Loss ||align=left| Kanchai Chor Sangpraphai || Lumpinee Stadium || Bangkok, Thailand || Decision || 5 || 3:00
|-  style="background:#cfc;"
| 2005-12-09 || Win ||align=left| Fameechai F.A. Group || Lumpinee Stadium || Bangkok, Thailand || Decision || 5 || 3:00
|-
! style=background:white colspan=9 |
|-  style="background:#cfc;"
| 2005-11-15 || Win ||align=left| Songkom Sor Yuphinda || Lumpinee Stadium || Bangkok, Thailand || Decision || 5 || 3:00
|-  style="background:#c5d2ea;"
| 2005-09-30 || Draw ||align=left| Fameechai F.A. Group || Lumpinee Stadium || Bangkok, Thailand || Decision || 5 || 3:00
|-  style="background:#cfc;"
| 2005-08-16 || Win ||align=left| Kompayak Fairtex || Lumpinee Stadium || Bangkok, Thailand || Decision || 5 || 3:00
|-  style="background:#cfc;"
| 2005-07-19 || Win ||align=left| Kangwanlek Petchyindee || Lumpinee Stadium || Bangkok, Thailand || Decision || 5 || 3:00
|-  style="background:#cfc;"
| 2005-06-11 || Win ||align=left| Daoprasuk Kiatkhumthorn || Lumpinee Stadium || Bangkok, Thailand || Decision || 5 || 3:00
|-  style="background:#cfc;"
| 2005-05-11 || Win ||align=left| Saensak Sor.Jareantong || Rajadamnern Stadium || Bangkok, Thailand || Decision || 5 || 3:00
|-  style="background:#cfc;"
| 2005-04-07 || Win ||align=left| Sipaenoi Sor.Srisompong || Daorungchujarean Fights, Rajadamnern Stadium || Bangkok, Thailand || Decision || 5 || 3:00
|-  style="background:#cfc;"
| 2005-03-12 || Win ||align=left| Denlampao Sor.Pongsit || Muaythai Lumpinee Krikkri Fights || Bangkok, Thailand || Decision || 5 || 3:00
|-
| colspan=9 | Legend:

See also
List of male kickboxers

References

1986 births
Living people
Lightweight kickboxers
Featherweight kickboxers
Nong-O Gaiyanghadao
Nong-O Gaiyanghadao
ONE Championship kickboxers
ONE Championship champions